The Palermo Technical Impact Hazard Scale is a logarithmic scale used by astronomers to rate the potential hazard of impact of a near-Earth object (NEO). It combines two types of data—probability of impact and estimated kinetic yield—into a single "hazard" value. A rating of 0 means the hazard is equivalent to the background hazard (defined as the average risk posed by objects of the same size or larger over the years until the date of the potential impact). A rating of +2 would indicate the hazard is 100 times as great as a random background event. Scale values less than −2 reflect events for which there are no likely consequences, while Palermo Scale values between −2 and 0 indicate situations that merit careful monitoring. A similar but less complex scale is the Torino Scale, which is used for simpler descriptions in the non-scientific media.

As of March 2023, One asteroid has a cumulative Palermo Scale value above −2: 101955 Bennu (−1.41). Six have cumulative Palermo Scale values between −2 and −3: (29075) 1950 DA (−2.05), 1979 XB (−2.72), 2021 EU (−2.74),  (−2.79),  (−2.83), and  (−2.98). There are 19 that have a cumulative Palermo Scale value between −3 and −4, three of which were discovered in 2022:  (−3.20),  (−3.56), and  (−3.94).

Scale
The scale compares the likelihood of the detected potential impact with the average risk posed by objects of the same size or larger over the years until the date of the potential impact. This average risk from random impacts is known as the background risk. The Palermo Scale value, P, is defined by the equation:

where
pi is the impact probability
T is the time interval over which pi is considered
fB is the background impact frequency

The background impact frequency is defined for this purpose as:

where the energy threshold E is measured in megatons, and yr is the unit of T divided by one year.

Positive rating 
In 2002 the near-Earth object  reached a positive rating on the scale of 0.18, indicating a higher-than-background threat. The value was subsequently lowered after more measurements were taken.  is no longer considered to pose any risk and was removed from the Sentry Risk Table on 1 August 2002.

In September 2002, the highest Palermo rating was that of asteroid (29075) 1950 DA, with a value of 0.17 for a possible collision in the year 2880. By March 2022, the rating had been reduced to −2.0.

For a brief period in late December 2004, with an observation arc of 190 days, asteroid  (then known only by its provisional designation ) held the record for the highest Palermo scale value, with a value of 1.10 for a possible collision in the year 2029. The 1.10 value indicated that a collision with this object was considered to be almost 12.6 times as likely as a random background event: 1 in 37 instead of 1 in 472. With further observation through 2021 there is no risk from Apophis for the next 100+ years.

See also
Asteroid impact avoidance
Asteroid impact prediction
Earth-grazing fireball
Impact event
List of asteroid close approaches to Earth
List of Earth-crossing asteroids
Torino scale
Time-domain astronomy

References

Further reading 

 The primary reference for the Palermo Technical Scale is "Quantifying the risk posed by potential Earth impacts" by Chesley et al., Icarus 159, 423-432 (2002).

External links
 Palermo Technical Impact Hazard Scale at the Sentry monitoring system by CNEOS at JPL from NASA

Alert measurement systems
Hazard scales
Planetary defense
Logarithmic scales of measurement